Elizabeth of Hungary (7 July 1207 – 17 November 1231), also known as Saint Elizabeth of Thuringia, or Saint Elisabeth of Thuringia, was a princess of the Kingdom of Hungary and the landgravine of Thuringia in Germany.

Elizabeth was married at the age of 14, and widowed at 20. After her husband's death, she regained her dowry, using the money to build a hospital where she herself served the sick. She became a symbol of Christian charity after her death at the age of 24 and was canonized on 25 May 1235. She is venerated as a saint by the Catholic Church. She was an early member of the Third Order of St. Francis, and is today honored as its patroness.

Early life and marriage
Elizabeth was the daughter of King Andrew II of Hungary and Gertrude of Merania. Her mother's sister was Hedwig of Andechs, wife of Duke Heinrich I of Silesia. Her ancestry included many notable figures of European royalty, going back as far as Vladimir the Great of the Kievan Rus'.

According to tradition, she was born in Hungary, possibly in the castle of Sárospatak, on 7 July 1207. However, a sermon printed in 1497 by the Franciscan friar Osvaldus de Lasco, a church official in Hungary, is the first source to specifically name Sárospatak as Elizabeth's birthplace, potentially building on local tradition. Osvaldus also translates the miracle of the roses to Elizabeth's childhood in Sárospatak and has her leave Hungary at the age of five.

According to a different tradition she was born in Pozsony, Hungary (present-day Bratislava, Slovakia), where she lived in the Castle of Posonium until the age of four. Elizabeth was brought to the court of the rulers of Thuringia in central Germany, to be betrothed to Louis IV, Landgrave of Thuringia (also known as Ludwig IV), a future union which would reinforce political alliances between the two families. She was raised by the Thuringian court and would have been familiar with the local language and culture.

In 1221, at the age of fourteen, Elizabeth married Louis; the same year he was enthroned as landgrave, and the marriage appears to have been happy.

Religious inclinations, influences
In 1223, Franciscan friars arrived, and the teenage Elizabeth not only learned about the ideals of Francis of Assisi, but started to live them. Louis was not upset by his wife's charitable efforts, believing that the distribution of his wealth to the poor would bring eternal reward; he is venerated in Thuringia as a saint, though he was never canonized by the church.

It was also about this time that the priest and later inquisitor Konrad von Marburg gained considerable influence over Elizabeth when he was appointed as her confessor. In the spring of 1226, when floods, famine and plague wrought havoc in Thuringia, Louis, a staunch supporter of the Hohenstaufen Frederick II, Holy Roman Emperor, represented Frederick II at the Imperial Diet held in Cremona.

Elizabeth assumed control of affairs at home and distributed alms in all parts of their territory, even giving away state robes and ornaments to the poor.

Widowhood

Elizabeth's life changed irrevocably on 11 September 1227 when Louis, en route to join the Sixth Crusade, died of a fever in Otranto, Italy, just a few weeks before the birth of her daughter Gertrude. Upon hearing the news of her husband's death, Elizabeth reportedly said, "He is dead. He is dead. It is to me as if the whole world died today." His remains were returned to Elizabeth in 1228 and entombed at the abbey of Reinhardsbrunn.

After Louis' death, his brother, Henry Raspe, assumed the regency during the minority of Elizabeth's eldest child, Hermann (1222–1241). After bitter arguments over the disposal of her dowry—a conflict in which Konrad was appointed as the official Defender of her case by Pope Gregory IX—Elizabeth left the court at Wartburg and moved to Marburg in Hesse.

Up to 1888 it was believed, on account of the testimony of one of Elizabeth's servants during the canonization process, that Elizabeth was driven from Wartburg in the winter of 1227 by her brother-in-law, Heinrich Raspe, who acted as regent for her son, then only five years old. About 1888 various investigators (Börner, Mielke, Wenck, E. Michael, etc.) asserted that Elizabeth left Wartburg voluntarily. She was not able at the castle to follow Konrad's command to eat only food obtained in a way that was certainly right and proper.

Following her husband's death, Elizabeth made solemn vows to Konrad similar to those of a nun. These vows included celibacy, as well as complete obedience to Konrad as her confessor and spiritual director. Konrad's treatment of Elizabeth was extremely harsh, and he held her to standards of behavior which were almost impossible to meet. Among the punishments he is alleged to have ordered were physical beatings; he also ordered her to send away her three children. Her pledge to celibacy proved a hindrance to her family's political ambitions. Elizabeth was more or less held hostage at Pottenstein, the castle of her uncle, Bishop Ekbert of Bamberg, in an effort to force her to remarry. Elizabeth, however, held fast to her vow, even threatening to cut off her own nose so that no man would find her attractive enough to marry.

Elizabeth's second child Sophie of Thuringia (1224–1275) married Henry II, Duke of Brabant, and was the ancestress of the Landgraves of Hesse, since in the War of the Thuringian Succession she won Hesse for her son Heinrich I, called the Child. Elizabeth's third child, Gertrude of Altenberg (1227–1297), was born several weeks after the death of her father; she became abbess of the monastery of Altenberg Abbey, Hesse near Wetzlar.

Elizabeth built a hospital at Marburg for the poor and the sick with the money from her dowry, where she and her companions cared for them.

The Miracles

Miracle of the roses

Elizabeth is perhaps best known for her miracle of the roses. While taking bread to the poor in secret, she met her husband Ludwig on a hunting party. Ludwig, to quell suspicions of the gentry that she was stealing treasure from the castle, asked her to reveal what was hidden under her cloak. In that moment, her cloak fell open and a vision of white and red roses could be seen, which proved to Ludwig that God's protecting hand was at work.

Her husband, according to the vitae, was never troubled by her charity and always supported it. In some versions of this story, her brother-in-law, Heinrich Raspe, questions her. Hers is one of many miracles that associate Christian saints with roses.

Christ in the bed
Another story told of Elizabeth, also found in Dietrich of Apolda's Vita, relates how she laid the leper Helias of Eisenach in the bed she shared with her husband. Her mother-in-law, who was horrified, told this immediately to Ludwig on his return. When Ludwig removed the bedclothes in great indignation, at that instant "Almighty God opened the eyes of his soul, and instead of a leper he saw the figure of Christ crucified stretched upon the bed." This story also appears in Franz Liszt's oratorio about Elizabeth.

Death and legacy

In 1231, Elizabeth died in Marburg at the age of twenty-four.

Miracles after death and canonization
Very soon after the death of Elizabeth, miracles were reported that happened at her grave in the church of the hospital, especially those of healing. On the suggestion of Konrad, and by papal command, examinations were held of those who had been healed between August 1232 and January 1235. The results of those examinations was supplemented by a brief vita of the saint-to-be, and together with the testimony of Elizabeth's handmaidens and companions (bound in a booklet called the Libellus de dictis quatuor ancillarum s. Elizabeth confectus), proved sufficient reason for quick canonization. She was canonized by Pope Gregory IX on 24 May 1235.

The papal bull declaring her a saint is on display in the Schatzkammer of the Deutschordenskirche in Vienna. Her body was laid in a magnificent golden shrine—still to be seen today—in the Elisabethkirche in Marburg. Marburg became a center of the Teutonic Order, which adopted Saint Elizabeth as its secondary patroness. The Order remained in Marburg until its official dissolution by Napoleon in 1803. The Elisabethkirche is now a Protestant church, but has spaces set aside for Catholic worship.

Elizabeth's shrine became one of the main German centers of pilgrimage of the 14th century and early 15th century. During the course of the 15th century, the popularity of the cult of Saint Elizabeth slowly faded, though to some extent this was mitigated by an aristocratic devotion to St Elizabeth, since through her daughter Sophia she was an ancestor of many leading aristocratic German families.

Three hundred years after her death, one of Elizabeth's many descendants, Philip I, Landgrave of Hesse, a leader of the Protestant Reformation, raided the church in Marburg. He demanded that the Teutonic Order hand over Elizabeth's bones, in order to disperse her relics and thus put an end to the already declining pilgrimages to Marburg. Philip took away the crowned agate chalice in which her head rested, but returned it after being imprisoned by Charles V, Holy Roman Emperor.

The reliquary chalice was subsequently plundered by Swedish troops during the Thirty Years' War, and is now on display at the Swedish History Museum. Her skull and some of her bones can be seen at the convent in Vienna bearing her name. A portion of her relics were kept in the church of the Carmelites in Brussels; another in the magnificent chapel of La Roche-Guyon, and a considerable part in a precious shrine is in the electoral treasury of Hanover. Another part of her relics were taken to Bogotá, then the capital of the Spanish New Kingdom of Granada, by friar Luis Zapata de Cárdenas. The relics are today inside a chapel dedicated to the saint in the Primatial Cathedral of Bogotá.

Elizabeth of Hungary is remembered in the Church of England with a Lesser Festival on 18 November and in the Episcopal Church on 19 November.

Association with the Franciscans
After her death, Elizabeth was commonly associated with the Third Order of Saint Francis, the primarily lay branch of the Franciscan Order, which has helped propagate her cult. Whether she ever actually joined the order, only recently founded in 1221, the year when she married Louis at the age of fourteen, is not proven to everyone's satisfaction.

It must be kept in mind though that the Third Order was such a new development in the Franciscan movement, that no one official ritual had been established at that point. Elizabeth clearly had a ceremony of consecration in which she adopted a Franciscan religious habit in her new way of life, as noted above.

Because of her support of the friars sent to Thuringia, she was made known to the founder, St Francis of Assisi, who sent her a personal message of blessing shortly before his death in 1226. Upon her canonization, she was declared the patron saint of the Third Order of St Francis, an honor she shares with St Louis IX of France.

Depiction in art and music
Saint Elizabeth is often depicted holding a basket of bread, or some other sort of food or beverage, characteristic of her devotion to the poor and hungry. The "miracle of the roses" has also proved a popular theme for artists.

In Charlotte Brontë's novel Villette, the Protestant narrator includes the story of Elizabeth's involvement with von Marburg as one of several Catholic stories of confessors "who had wickedly abused their office, trampling to deep degradation high-born ladies, making of countesses and princesses the most tormented slaves under the sun."

2007 octocentennial celebrations
The year 2007 was proclaimed Elizabeth Year in Marburg. All year, events commemorating Elizabeth's life and works were held, culminating in a town-wide festival to celebrate the 800th anniversary of her birth on 7 July 2007. Pilgrims came from all over the world for the occasion, which ended with a special service in the Elisabeth Church that evening.

A new musical based on Elizabeth's life, Elisabeth--die Legende einer Heiligen (Elizabeth--Legend of a Saint), starring Sabrina Weckerlin as Elizabeth, Armin Kahn as Ludwig, and Chris Murray as Konrad, premiered in Eisenach in 2007. It was performed in Eisenach and Marburg for two years, and closed in Eisenach in July 2009.

The entire Third Order of St. Francis, both the friars and sisters of the Third Order Regular and the Secular Franciscan Order, joined in this celebration through a two-year-long program of study of her life. This was conducted throughout the Order, across the globe. There were also religious ceremonies held worldwide during that period. The yearlong observance of the centennial which began on her feast day in 2007 was closed at the General Chapter of the Order, held in Budapest in 2008. The New York region of the Order produced a movie of her life, produced by a sister of the Order, Lori Pieper.

Ancestry

Honors
Saint Elizabeth of Hungary: On the 700-year anniversary of her death, Hungary issued a set of four stamps in her honor: on 21 April 1932; on 1 August 1944 one postage stamp was issued; on 16 July 1938 Czechoslovakia issued a stamp in her honor showing the Cathedral of St. Elizabeth in Košice. She was declared the patron saint of the same city in 2019.

The hymn "Wenn das Brot, das wir teilen", written for a pilgrimage to places in Thuringia connected to her life, refers to her Miracle of the roses, and mentions other works of charity.

Gallery

See also
Hungarian nobility
Isten, hazánkért térdelünk
Saint Elizabeth of Hungary, patron saint archive

Notes

References

Further reading
 de Robeck, Nesta. Saint Elizabeth of Hungary: A Story of Twenty-Four Years. Milwaukee: The Bruce Publishing Company, 1954. 
 Seesholtz, Anne. Saint Elizabeth: Her Brother's Keeper. New York: Philosophical Library, 1948.
 Coudenhove, Ida Friederike. “The Nature of Sanctity: A Dialogue.” In Essays on Religion and Culture, edited by T. F. Burns and Christopher Dawson, translated by Ruth Bonsall And Edward Watkin, 1:125–96. The Persistence of Order. Providence, RI: Cluny Media, 2019.

External links

 
 
 

 
 
 
 

1207 births
1231 deaths
People from Sárospatak
Hungarian princesses
German princesses
Hungarian people of German descent
Beatified and canonised Árpádians
Hungarian emigrants to Germany
Landgravines of Thuringia
Members of the Third Order of Saint Francis
Hungarian Roman Catholic saints
German Roman Catholic saints
Pre-Reformation Anglican saints
Medieval Hungarian saints
Medieval German saints
Pre-Reformation saints of the Lutheran liturgical calendar
Burials at St. Elizabeth's Church, Marburg
Franciscan saints
Roman Catholic royal saints
13th-century Christian saints
Female saints of medieval Germany
Female saints of medieval Hungary
13th-century German people
13th-century German women
13th-century Hungarian people
13th-century Hungarian women
Anglican saints
Daughters of kings